Domingo and the Mist (Spanish: Domingo y la niebla) is a 2022 Costa Rican drama film directed by Ariel Escalante Meza. It had its international premiere on May 25, 2022 at the 75th Cannes Film Festival in competition for the Un Certain Regard, thus becoming the only Costa Rican and Central American film to compete in this section. It was selected as the Costa Rican entry for Best International Feature Film at the 95th Academy Awards.

Synopsis 
Domingo's house, in the mountains of Costa Rica, is about to be expropriated due to the construction of a highway. But his land hides a secret: the ghost of his deceased wife visits him through the fog. Domingo is determined: he will never give up his land, even if it means resorting to violence.

Cast 

 Carlos Urena as Domingo
 Sylvia Sossa as Sylvia
 Esteban Brenes Serrano as Yendrick
 Arias Vindas as Paco

Production 
It was shot in Cascajal, Costa Rica with the participation of 50 citizens, produced by Incendio Cine together with Bicha Cine and the Costa Rican Center for Film Production.

See also 

 List of submissions to the 95th Academy Awards for Best International Feature Film
 List of Costa Rican submissions for the Academy Award for Best International Feature Film

References

External links 

 

2022 films
2022 drama films
Costa Rican drama films
2020s Spanish-language films
Films set in Costa Rica
Films shot in Costa Rica
Films about old age